John O'Gorman Arundel (November 4, 1927 – September 19, 2002) was a Canadian professional ice hockey defenceman who played three games in the National Hockey League with the Toronto Maple Leafs during the 1949–50 season. The rest of his career, which lasted from 1948 to 1955, was spent in the minor leagues.

Career statistics

Regular season and playoffs

Awards and achievements
 Memorial Cup Championships (1945 & 1948)
 MJHL First All-Star Team (1948)
 Allan Cup Championship (1949)

External links
 

1927 births
2002 deaths
Canadian expatriate ice hockey players in the United States
Canadian ice hockey defencemen
Los Angeles Monarchs players
Oshawa Generals players
Ottawa Senators (QSHL) players
Pittsburgh Hornets players
Ice hockey people from Winnipeg
Toronto Maple Leafs players
Toronto St. Michael's Majors players
Winnipeg Monarchs players